The fourth season of The New Adventures of Old Christine premiered on CBS on Wednesday nights at 8:00pm on September 24, 2008 and concluded on May 20, 2009. It consisted of 22 episodes.

In this season, as Barb is divorced she is facing deportation from the U.S. so Christine decides to marry her in a sham lesbian marriage in order to keep her best friend in the country. Richard and New Christine become engaged while Matthew finds love with one of his clients. Christine has a brief relationship with an obsessive man named Patrick, while she and Barb decide to turn their gym into a spa which they later shockingly discover has turned into a brothel. On the day of Richard and New Christine's wedding, Christine briefly gets back together with New Christine's father, but is later left heart broken when she discovers that he is engaged. This causes Richard to rush to Christine's side leaving New Christine angry and jealous causing her to leave him at the altar. Meanwhile, Barb and Christine's sham marriage is discovered by an INS officer leaving Barb imprisoned.

Cast and characters

Main
 Julia Louis-Dreyfus as "Old" Christine Campbell
 Clark Gregg as Richard Campbell
 Hamish Linklater as Matthew Kimble
 Trevor Gagnon as Ritchie Campbell
 Emily Rutherfurd as "New" Christine Hunter
 Tricia O'Kelley and Alex Kapp Horner as Marly and Lindsay (a.k.a. "The Meanie Moms")
 Wanda Sykes as Barbara 'Barb' Baran

Recurring
 Michaela Watkins as Lucy
 Lily Goff as Ashley Ehrhardt
 Marissa Blanchard as Kelsey

Guest stars
 Ernie Grunwald as Salesman
 Amy Farrington as Ali
 Mary Beth McDonough as Mrs. Wilhoite
 Jeffrey Tambor as Neil
 Tim DeKay as Patrick Harris
 Dan Gauthier as Brian
 Brenda Blethyn as Angela Kimble
 Megan Mullally as Margaret
 Lauren Bowles as Patty
 Bob Clendenin as Mr. Tuttle
 Lee Tergesen as Todd Watski
 Stephen Tobolowsky as Principal Merrow
 Charles Esten as Joe Campbell
 Crista Flanagan as Andrea
 Kristen Johnston as Francie
 Paula Newsome as Principal Slater
 Kathleen Wilhoite as Denise Sellick
 Constance Zimmer as Amy Hunter
 Scott Bakula as 'Papa' Jeff Hunter
 James Lesure as Dave

Episodes

Ratings

References

2008 American television seasons
2009 American television seasons